The following is an overview of the various villains featured in the long  running Super Friends franchise.

Legion of Doom
The Legion of Doom is a fictional group of supervillains led by Lex Luthor that appeared in Challenge of the Super Friends, an animated series that starred superheroes from DC Comics.

In each episode they appeared in, the Legion of Doom enacted various plots against the Super Friends, only to be met with defeat by the end of the story. Often, however, they escaped capture through a last-minute plan.

The Hall of Doom was often positioned in a swamp outside Gotham City. It resembled Darth Vader's helmet. It could fly and be remote-controlled, and travel through time and another dimension. The Legion of Doom often used it to escape, for example rays from it could teleport the Legion. The group returned infrequently, notably in the Challenge of the Super Friends inspired Legends of the Superheroes.

Bizarro
Bizarro appears in the animated television series Challenge of the Super Friends (1978) voiced by William Callaway; Super Friends (1980 - 1982) and The Super Powers Team: Galactic Guardians (1985 - 1986) voiced by Danny Dark. He is seen as a member of the Legion of Doom as an unambiguous villain. In one story he shows knowledge of how to construct a Growth Ray that makes someone 100 feet tall.
 Bizarro appears in the 1980s revival of Super Friends. In "The Revenge of Doom", Bizarro is seen with the Legion of Doom when they get back together. In two other episodes, Bizarro is a lone villain.
 Bizarro appears, voiced by Danny Dark, in "The Bizarro Super Powers Team", an episode of The Super Powers Team: Galactic Guardians. This version is a more faithful adaptation from the comics as a well-meaning bumbler.

Bizarro World
Bizarro World makes its first television appearance in Super Friends in the episodes "The Revenge of Bizarro" from 1980 and "Bizarowurld" from 1981. Bizarro World also appeared in the episode "The Bizarro Super Powers Team" from The Super Powers Team: Galactic Guardians. Bizarro World is populated by countless imperfect duplicates of Supermen and Lois Lane, led by Bizarro #1.

Black Manta
Manta appeared on The All-New Super Friends Hour, where he was referred to simply as "Manta" and his suit color was now olive brown.

Black Manta also became a part of the Legion of Doom in Challenge of the Super Friends, where he was voiced by Ted Cassidy. He is never shown without his helmet here. In the episode Doomsday, when he, Sinestro and Cheetah are abandoned by the rest of the Legion of Doom he takes control of a mental device to capture and punish the rest of the Legion.

Brainiac
Ted Cassidy voices Brainiac in Challenge of the Super Friends, and Stanley Ralph Ross in Super Friends including Super Friends: The Legendary Super Powers Show and The Super Powers Team: Galactic Guardians.
 Brainiac also appeared in a Super Friends short episode "Superclones." He ended up cloning Aquaman and El Dorado. He was voiced by Stanley Ralph Ross, who took over for the late Cassidy in 1980.
 The mechanical version of Brainiac appeared in Super Friends: The Legendary Super Powers Show in the episodes "The Wrath of Brainiac" and "The Village of Lost Souls" again voiced by Stanley Ralph Ross. In "The Wrath of Brainiac," Brainiac reveals that he shed his earlier appearance when he worked alongside Darkseid.
 Brainiac next appeared in The Super Powers Team: Galactic Guardians episode called "Brain Child" once again voiced by Stanley Ralph Ross.

Captain Cold
On the ABC animated series Challenge of the Super Friends, Captain Cold is one of two Flash villains (along with Grodd) that appear as members of Lex Luthor's Legion of Doom. Dick Ryal provided the voice of Captain Cold. This version of Captain Cold was depicted as having pale blue skin.

Cheetah
The Priscilla Rich version of Cheetah appears in Challenge of the Super Friends and was played by Marlene Aragon vocally. She appeared earlier in the Super Friends comic as part of the Super Foes. In one of the Cheetah's most memorable episodes "The Secret Origins of the Super Friends", the Legion of Doom travel into the past to eliminate Superman, Green Lantern and Wonder Woman before they can become heroes. The villains arrive at Paradise Island, moments before Princess Diana competes in the Tournament she will win to become Wonder Woman. The Cheetah disguises herself as an Amazon to compete in the games and stop Diana, her athletic skills allowing her to get through most of the competition. As the tournament ends, only Diana and the Cheetah remain in contention and meet each other in a battle of stun rays to crown a winner. To assist her, the Cheetah uses "radar controlled" bracelets to deflect Diana's laser rays back at her, stunning the Amazon Princess. The Cheetah is hailed as the winner and is presented with the uniform and weapons of Wonder Woman. The blonde villainess, now wearing the uniform of the Amazon champion, gloats in her victory, "I've done it! Now I am Wonder Woman!". The Cheetah's victory causes Diana to be removed from the future timeline, thus eliminating Wonder Woman. However, the Legion of Doom's triumph is short-lived. The remaining Super Friends uncover the scheme and travel back in time to undo the damage. The Flash arrives at Paradise Island and uses his super-speed to deflect the rays meant to hit Diana and back at the Cheetah, stunning her. Diana is named the winner and goes on to become Wonder Woman.

Giganta
Giganta appears in Challenge of the Super Friends voiced by Ruth Forman. She appears as a powerful member of the Legion of Doom. In the TV series, she has the ability to grow to giant size (with accompanying superhuman strength) simply by willing it (at the time, she did not yet possess this ability in the comics). She typically dresses in a leopard skin two-piece loincloth (presumably treating them so that they grow with her when she uses her powers to achieve her gigantic stature), wears large, bangle-like bracelets and anklets, and she is always barefoot (like her original appearances). Her muscular body is a side effect of her powers.

In the episode "History of Doom," it was revealed that Giganta was a normal woman who was horseriding when she witnessed Apache Chief using magic dust. The latter used it to grow larger so he could fight off a grizzly bear. Giganta stole the dust and used it on herself, gaining the ability to transform into a powerful,  giantess. The dust not only gave the two size changing powers, but influences personality as well. Because Apache Chief was brave when using it he became one hundred times braver. Because Giganta had evil thoughts, it made her eviler.

Giganta later appeared in the Super Friends short episodes "Two Gleeks are Deadlier Than One" and "Revenge of Doom" again voiced by Ruth Forman. In "Two Gleeks are Deadlier Than One," she and Gorilla Grodd capture Gleek and make an evil clone of him. In "Revenge of Doom," she was present when the Legion of Doom got back together but had no dialogue. Giganta teams with Grodd again to turn the residents of Gorilla City into humans and against the Super Friends in Super Friends #30 (March 1980).

Gorilla Grodd
On the ABC animated series Challenge of the Super Friends, Gorilla Grodd is one of two Flash villains (along with Captain Cold) that appear as members of Lex Luthor's Legion of Doom. In one episode, Grodd hatches a plot to take control of Gorilla City and use its citizens to conquer the world. He later appeared in the Super Friends short episodes "Revenge of Doom", and "Two Gleeks Are Deadlier Than One". Grodd teams with Giganta to turn the residents of Gorilla City into humans and against the Super Friends in Super Friends #30 (March 1980). This version of Grodd, though highly intelligent, never displays telepathic abilities.He was played by Stanley Ralph Ross.

Solomon Grundy
Solomon Grundy appears in the 1970s animated series Challenge of the Super Friends as a member of Lex Luthor's Legion of Doom, voiced by Jimmy Weldon. In this cartoon series, Grundy speaks broken English with a southern accent. This version of the character was later used in a promotional spot for Cartoon Network, with Solomon Grundy declaring that "Solomon Grundy want pants too!" in response to Brainiac's request for pants.

This incarnation of Grundy is arguably one of the more "intelligent" versions of the character, as he is able to carry on a conversation and devise plans of his own.

Lex Luthor

Luthor was a recurring villain in Hanna-Barbera's Super Friends franchise that ran from the mid-1970s to the mid-1980s. He was voiced by Stan Jones. Of all the comic book villains to appear in the show, Lex Luthor appears in the most episodes, more than any other villain.

 He makes his Super Friends debut in Challenge of the Super Friends. Luthor, was head of the Legion of Doom, a coalition of villains who plotted the downfall of the titular heroes. Luthor appeared a little slimmer than in his previous animated appearance and sported his pre-Crisis purple jumpsuit. In the episode History Of Doom depicts a portion of Lex Luthor's origin from Adventure Comics #271.
 In the series The World's Greatest Super Friends season the second episode 'Lex Luthor Strikes Back' features Luthor escaping from jail and challenging the Super Friends.
 He also appears in the series Super Friends: The Legendary Super Powers Show season, in the opening and the episodes No Honor Among Super Thieves -in which acquires his power suit from the comics of then-, Case of the Shrinking Super Friends and The Mask of Mystery.
 In the series The Super Powers Team: Galactic Guardians season, briefly appears at the beginning of the episode The Seeds of Doom.

Doctor Natas
The episode "Superfriends: Rest In Peace" makes a reference to a former unseen member of the Legion, the only time such a reference has been made. This was Doctor Natas (Satan spelled backwards), the inventor of the Noxium crystal that had the power to destroy all of the Super Friends. The Super Friends knew of this crystal and tricked the Legion into thinking that it had killed all of them (using android doubles of the Super Friends). They anticipated the Legion throwing away the crystal when they no longer needed it. The crystal was retrieved by the Super Friends and launched into deep space. Natas' fate is unknown, and the Legion apparently was unable to recreate the crystal.

Riddler
The Riddler teamed with fellow villain Skyrocket in Super Friends #4 (April 1977). He went on to appear in Hanna-Barbera's Challenge of the Super Friends as a member of the Legion of Doom. He was voiced by Michael Bell. He made his only solo appearance in a Super Friends short episode, "Around The World In 80 Riddles."  He appears as a member of the Legion of Doom; he usually gives riddles to the Super Friends to delay them from meddling with the Legion's plans. In "Monolith of Evil," he uses a riddle to trick the Super Friends into getting a Monolith of enormous power guarded by a Lava Monster for the Legion after they fooled the Super Friends into abducting the United Nations and disguising the Monolith as the United Nations.
 As previously mentioned, he made his only solo appearance in a Super Friends short episode, "Around the World in 80 Riddles", again voiced by Michael Bell. Here, he uses his new Stupid Spray (which slowly causes the intelligence of those sprayed upon to be reduced to the intelligence of babies) on Superman, Wonder Woman, Batman and Robin, where different riddles will provide clues where the antidote can be found. The first one quotes "As your I.Q. drops to below 42, you'll need mya help to tya your shoes". The answer to the riddle led Super Friends to the Mayan ruins, where they ended up in one of Riddler's deathtraps. After barely escaping the deathtrap, Superman, Wonder Woman, Batman and Robin find what appeared to be the antidote only to be a container for another riddle. The riddle reads "You're probably too stupid now, so here's an easy clue. Climb the tallest mountain until you turn blue". Due to the group's dwindling intelligence, Batman had to use the Batcomputer on his Batplane to decipher the riddle, with the answer being Mount Everest. Upon arriving at Mount Everest, Superman, Wonder Woman, Batman and Robin encounter Riddler's blimp, where the Stupid Spray is at its final effect on them. The Super Friends managed to claim the Stupid Spray Antidote and defeat Riddler. In "Revenge of Doom", Riddler was with the Legion of Doom when they got back together.

Scarecrow
The Scarecrow appears in the 1978 Challenge of the Super Friends. He appears as a member of Lex Luthor's Legion of Doom voiced by Don Messick. His voice is raspy, fitting with his scare theme. Here he is shown to have control over a flock of crows, but no other powers. In one story, he beats Apache Chief in a contest to capture a two-headed snake by freeing a head Apache Chief had captured, then lassoing both heads.

In Super Friends #32 (May 1980), Scarecrow returns to induce phobias in the Super Friends such that they can no longer operate as crimefighters.

The Scarecrow later appeared in the Super Powers Team: Galactic Guardians episode "The Fear" voiced by Andre Stojka. In this episode he captures Batman, Robin and Wonder Woman; he then exposes them to his fear gas in what was the first animated rendition of Batman's origin, as he forces the Crusader to relive his memories of his parents' deaths.

Sinestro
Sinestro has been prominently featured in Challenge of the Super Friends (where he was part of the "Legion of Doom") voiced by Vic Perrin.  He is shown to have the power to travel to the antimatter Universe without much trouble.
 Sinestro appeared in the Super Friends episode "The Revenge of Doom" voiced again by Vic Perrin. He is with the Legion of Doom when they get back together again.

Toyman
The Toyman is a recurring villain on the Challenge of the Super Friends television cartoon voiced by Frank Welker. He appears as one of the members of Lex Luthor's Legion of Doom. The Toyman in the Super Friends series bears the likeness of Jack Nimball (as he is named in the comics). This version of the Toyman often dresses like a jester and wears a domino mask. In one episode he is shown to have control of a world of deadly toys within a black hole.
 He was supposed to appear in the episode "The Case of the Dreadful Dolls" during Super Friends: The Legendary Super Powers Show as the villain, but was off-limits and replaced by an exclusive villain known as Dollmaker. (not to be confused with the Batman villain of the same name)

New Gods of Apokolips

In the mid-1980s, Darkseid, Kalibak, Desaad, and the planet Apokolips were featured in the final two incarnations of the Super Friends animated series, entitled Super Friends: The Legendary Super Powers Show and The Super Powers Team: Galactic Guardians. New Genesis and its residents did not appear and were not mentioned.

Darkseid
Darkseid appears in the cartoons, Super Friends: The Legendary Super Powers Show (1984) and The Super Powers Team: Galactic Guardians (1985) voiced by Frank Welker.

Boom tube
Outside of the comic books, boom tubes have been seen on a number of occasions. They are first seen in the last two season of the Super Friends animated series, Super Friends: The Legendary Super Powers Show and The Super Powers Team: Galactic Guardians on a number of occasions. Here, they are referred to as "Star Gates," and they are used by the natives of Apokolips. New Genesis was never shown or mentioned.

DeSaad
DeSaad appeared in two of the 1980s incarnations of the Super Friends animated series: Super Friends: The Legendary Super Powers Show and The Super Powers Team: Galactic Guardians, and was voiced by René Auberjonois.

Kalibak
Kalibak appeared in the last two incarnations of the original animated series, Super Friends, as his first televised appearance where he and Darkseid were voiced by Frank Welker.  His appearance was not as brutish as later TV incarnations, more like the original Jack Kirby design for the character.  He was almost always depicted as boastful, dull-witted and ineffectual against the heroes.

Parademons
On the final season (1985–86) of the Super Friends, when Darkseid became a recurring villain, the Parademons followed - although the use of the word "demon" on television was often protested by parents' groups. Thus, Darkseid's minions were always referred to as "para-drones" on that show. Their vocalizations are provided by Frank Welker.

Super Foes
A villainous analogy to the Super Friends featuring major enemies to each of the heroic group's members. The villains also adopted the Justice League's concept of training young heroes by adding youthful counterparts to themselves. Introduced in the first two issues of the Super Friends (1976) comic.

Cheetah
Wonder Woman's feline nemesis who joined the Legion of Doom. Cheetah took on Kitten as her younger trainee.

Human Flying Fish
One of Aquaman's major enemies, the Human Flying Fish was Vic Bragg, a human physically altered to breathe underwater and survive the depths of the ocean while employing a suit which additionally provided flight through the air. His protege was Sardine.

Penguin
A criminal mastermind and major foe to Batman, the Penguin employed a cache of trick umbrellas in his crimes. He adopted Chick as his youthful apprentice. Penguin went on to appear in The Super Powers Team: Galactic Guardians, where he gains Superman's superpowers by accident when Felix Faust tries to get them for himself. Ironically, Batman is not featured in the episode. This version of the Penguin was voiced by Robert Morse. Penguin was intended to be part of the League of Evil in Battle of the Superheroes but he was licensed to Filmation and left out of what became Challenge of the Super Friends.

Poison Ivy
A brilliant scientist in botany, Pamela Isley turned to crime as Poison Ivy and fought Batman. Her junior partner was Honeysuckle. Ivy was intended to be part of the League of Evil in Battle of the Superheroes but she was licensed to Filmation and left out of what became Challenge of the Super Friends.

Toyman
Superman's enemy in the group, Winslow Schott was the Super Foes' Toyman while later his successor Jack Nimball joined the Legion of Doom. Schott's trainee was Toyboy. Schott returned to face the Super Friends with his gang in Super Friends #41 (February 1981).

Other villains from DC Comics

Bizarra
An earlier animated version of Bizarra was shown in an episode of the 1985 television series The Super Powers Team: Galactic Guardians titled "The Bizarro Super Powers Team". In the episode, Bizarro decides that his world of Bizarros needs more heroes than just Bizarro Supermen. He takes a duplicator ray to Earth and makes Bizarro duplicates of Wonder Woman, Firestorm and Cyborg. Planning on taking them back to protect Bizarro World, Mister Mxyzptlk convinces Bizarro to train his new friends on Earth, which causes havoc for the real Super Friends. In the episode, Bizarra is called Bizarro Wonder Woman and is voiced by actress B.J. Ward, who also voiced Wonder Woman.

Chronos
When Chronos distorts time in Gotham City, it's up to the Super Friends to stop him. Appears in Super Friends #22 (July 1979).

The Conqueror
Capturing Kanjar Ro, Queen Bee, Sinestro, Hector Hammond, Time Trapper, and World Beater, the Conqueror gains the power to defeat any foe. First appearance in Super Friends #45 (June 1981).

Joe Chill
In The Super Powers Team: Galactic Guardians episode "The Fear," a flashback depicts Thomas and Martha Wayne being mugged by someone who might be Joe Chill. This flashback is induced by the Scarecrow. When his father tries to fight him, a young Bruce says "No Dad, he's got a..." and lightning is shown in the sky as his parents are shot. This episode represents the first time that Batman's origin is portrayed on television. He is voiced by Michael Rye.

Crime Syndicate of America
The World's Greatest Super Friends episode "Universe of Evil" features Superman encountering evil versions of the rest of the team from an alternate universe, called the "Super Enemies" (he temporarily swapped places with his own evil counterpart, who wrought havoc and almost defeated the rest of the Super Friends until they swapped back just in time) when trying to stop Mount Vesuvius from erupting (which their Superman was causing). This universe's version of the Hall of Justice is called the Hall of Evil, and a demonic-looking face is on the outside of the building. The Super Enemies themselves appear almost identical to the Super Friends, although their version of Aquaman has an eyepatch, Batman's costume is red rather than blue, and Robin has a moustache.

Felix Faust
Felix Faust attends a Halloween masquerade transforming wealthy guests into the monsters they're in costume as (Bizarro, Solomon Grundy, Etrigan the Demon, Man-Bat, and Swamp Thing) in order to get their gems in Super Friends #28 (January 1980). In an episode of The Super Powers Team: Galactic Guardians, Felix Faust (voiced by Peter Cullen) was in a prison with the Penguin. Faust was about to cast a spell to escape by transferring Superman's powers into himself, but Penguin seized the opportunity, stole the Superman powers, and broke out easily, leaving Faust behind. Faust later stripped Penguin of Superman's powers, and gained them himself after he had his spirits apprehend Penguin. He also proved vulnerable to Kryptonite when Firestorm changed his headwear into it. Wonder Woman used her lasso to force Felix Faust into relinquishing Superman's powers. The two were again jailed in the same cell, much to the dismay of both.

Gentleman Ghost
Gentleman Ghost appears in the All-New Super Friends Hour episode titled "Ghost", where a man casts a spell to bring Gentleman Ghost to the living so that he can take revenge on Superman and Wonder Woman for imprisoning his spirit. He uses his powers to turn U.N. representatives into ghosts and later turns Superman and Wonder Woman into ghosts.  The curse is eventually broken, after which the Super Friends used the mystical Rods of Merlin to send Gentleman Ghost back to his grave, never to return. He is referred to only as "Gentleman Jim Craddock" in the episode, not as "Gentleman Ghost." He was voiced by Alan Oppenheimer.

Grax
Rival to Brainiac and enemy of Superman, Grax plants twelve bombs across Earth. The Wonder Twins come to Earth to warn the Super Friends which prompts the group to team with the Global Guardians to find and defuse the bombs in Super Friends #7-9. He returns in issue 38 empowering gangsters with intangibility.

Green Thumb
In Super Friends #42 (March 1981), Fargo Keyes employs alien plants to battle the Super Friends as Green Thumb.

Greenback
Using money as his weapon, Greenback kidnaps Bruce Wayne for ransom. First appearance in Super Friends #5 (June 1977).

Johnny Witts
Johnny Witts and his gang of impersonators assume the guise of the Super Friends in order to uncover their secret identities. First appears in Super Friends #26 (November 1979).

The Joker
The Joker makes an appearance in the final incarnation of Super Friends, The Super Powers Team: Galactic Guardians, in the episode "The Wild Cards", which features a version of the Royal Flush Gang. The leader of the group, Ace, turns out to be a disguised Joker (voiced by Frank Welker).  Batman determined the Joker's masquerade upon noticing that the Joker's house of cards was short of the Joker's namesake card.

Kingslayer
An assassin specializing in eliminating world leaders, Kingslayer is hired by the Overlord to kill global rulers in a bid to seize power. His sights become set on Solovar, Nuidis Vulko, Queen Astrid, Prince Ali, Princess Evalina, and Prince Mark. First appearance in Super Friends #11 (April–May 1978).

Menagerie Man
Employing white dwarf star technology, Menagerie Man sports a shrunken zoo of trained animals he can produce seemingly out of thin air. First appearance in Super Friends #6 (August 1977).

Menthruy
An alien that abducts Poseidonis in Super Friends #27 (December 1979).

Mirror Master
Mirror Master sends the Super Friends into different universes in Super Friends #23 (August 1979). He returns in an episode of Super Friends: The Legendary Super Powers Show entitled "Reflections in Crime." In the episode, Mirror Master sets about trapping the Super Friends in this particular episode inside mirrors called the sixth dimension. The Super Friends managed to escape and trap Mirror Master in a House of Mirrors.

Mr. Mxyzptlk
Mr. Mxyzptlk appeared in the Super Friends animated series, voiced by Frank Welker.  In that series, Mxyzptlk's name is pronounced as Miks-ill-plik (backwards, Kilp-ill-skim) and he takes to tormenting all the members of the team, even when Superman is absent. In one episode Mr. Kltpzyxm, a Bizarro Mxyzptlk is created, who promptly speeds off to turn Bizarro world into a beautiful planet like Earth, much to Bizarro's horror.

Monocle
Graeme the Monocle makes people see illusions to break down order in Super Friends #40 (January 1981).

Overlord
Sandor Fane poses as the Overlord and hires the Kingslayer to eliminate prominent leaders around Earth in order to seize power. Fane later took control of the minds of the Elementals (Salamander, Gnome, Undine, and the Sylph) in order to destroy the Super Friends. Upon his defeat, his henchman Underling assumes his identity. This new Overlord returns to control the minds of the Super Friends into becoming tyrants. Later, this Overlord clones himself and hyper-evolves him to create Futurio. First appearance in Super Friends #11 (April–May 1978).

Royal Flush Gang
In The Super Powers Team: Galactic Guardians, the Royal Flush Gang seen in the episode "The Wild Cards". They are a quartet of thieves recruited by the mysterious Ace (here not an android). Ace is revealed to not only be in league with Darkseid, but also to be the Joker in disguise, as deduced by Batman upon realizing that the Joker's house of cards was missing his namesake card. By the end of the episode, Ten, who feels in over her head, switches sides and the rest of the gang and Joker are captured.

Shark
A villain called Shark appears in the All-New Super Friends Hour episode "The Protector." It's uncertain which Shark it is, as his real name is never mentioned in the episode, but he most resembles the third Shark, but not very much.

Skyrocket
High-flying super-villain capable of emitting powerful sparks from his hands that teamed with Riddler. First appearance in Super Friends #4 (April 1977).

Superiorman and Wondrous Woman
Yeltu and Fegla of Exor come to Earth as body-doubles of Superman and Wonder Woman in Superiorman and Wondrous Woman, respectively.
First appearance in Super Friends #21 (June 1979).

Time Trapper
Ty M. Master, the Time Trapper, sabotages Professor Carter Nichols' time machine casting the Wonder Twins through time in Super Friends #17 (February 1979).

Warhead
Rupert C. Hall, better known as a munitions thief named Warhead, is sought by the Super Friends and Plastic Man. First appearance in Super Friends #36 (September 1980).

Weather Wizard
Weather Wizard battles the Super Friends in Super Friends #37 (October 1980).

World Beater
Dr. Ihdrom creates the powerful android World Beater from the demise of over 100 super-villains including Spectrum, Anti-Man, Thunderhead, Powerhouse, The Traveler, The Apparition, Turncoat, Ultra-Light, Firelord, Sub-Zero, and Bombshell and pits his creation against Earth's heroes. First appearance in Super Friends #3 (February 1977).

Yarq
A criminal and his gang from Exor that come to Earth and steal the Super Friends memories in Super Friends #44 (May 1981).

Zond and Zhanra
Ancient Exorian criminals, Zond and Zhanra switch places with the Wonder Twins in Super Friends #24 (September 1979).

Villains appearing not adapted from the comic books

Count Dracula

Count Dracula appears in an episode entitled "Attack of the Vampire."  The episode was originally aired on October 14, 1978.  In the episode, Dracula arises and tries to turn the whole world into vampires. The Super Friends battle Dracula, who transforms Superman and the Wonder Twins into vampires. Dracula uses intense beams from his eyes to transform his victims into vampires.

Dr. Hiram Gulliver
Using a micro-wave reducer, Dr. Gulliver shrinks the world's adults to reduce the use of resources of the planet and to stand as a giant as the planet's ruler. Appears in the Super Friends episode "Gulliver’s Gigantic Goof" (1973).

Dr. LaBond
Stealing diamonds to power his Planet Splitter, LaBond plans to turn the planet Signus Uno into a second moon to provide more natural resources for Earth. Appears in the Super Friends episode "The Planet Splitter" (1973).

Dr. Pelagian
Marine biologist Dr. Ansil Hillbrandt adopts the identity of Dr. Pelagian and terrorizes industrialists to topple pollution. Pelagian employs technology that allows him to speak with sea creatures and control the weather and sea. Appears in the Super Friends episode "Dr. Pelagian’s War" (1973).

Dr. Rebos
Seeking to eliminate the space program, Dr. Rebos builds robot duplicates of Wonder Dog and Superman for sabotage. Appears in the Super Friends episode "The Androids" (1973).

Dr. Thinkquick
From the bitterly cold continent Glacia, Thinkquick uses a tugboat with a jet nozzle to shift the Gulf Stream to warm his homeland as weather is disrupted around the globe. Appears in the Super Friends episode "The Weather Maker" (1973).

Dr. Victor Frankenstein

In an episode of The World's Greatest Super Friends, the team battle Dr. Victor Frankenstein and two of his monsters, one with all of the powers of Superman, Batman, and Wonder Woman (drawing allusions to Amazo or Super Duper).

Hank and Ben
Scientists that employ a blue jet that emits a blue beam to destroy the world's gold, believing the material to be the root of all evil. Appears in the Super Friends episode "The Ultra Beam" (1973).

Holo and Zara
Aliens trying to strip Earth of its silicon from its oceans to power their space vessel to return to their home planet. Appears in the Super Friends episode "The Watermen" (1973).

King Plasto
Heisting raw plastic powder, King Plasto creates Frerp. Appears in the Super Friends episode "The Fantastic Frerps" (1973).

Kolbar
Hailing from the scorching planet Solartararium, Kolbar sought another world for his people when Solartararium begins to cool due to pollution. Trying to heat the Earth for this purpose, the Super Friends stop him and clean Solartararium restoring its temperatures. Appears in the Super Friends episode "Too Hot To Handle" (1973).

Noah Tall
An evil genius that sought to capture the Balloon People of Balunia to uncover their powers of teleportation. Appears in the Super Friends episode "The Balloon People" (1973).

Orville Gump

He appears in the episode "Lex Luthor Strikes Back" in World's Greatest Super Friends, talking with Luthor about his new plans against the team hero, in the same underground lair in the Metropolis subways of the said first Superman movie from 1978.  He disguised himself as Jimmy Olsen at the beginning of the episode before revealing his true self.

Phantom Zone villains
In the 1978 series Super Friends there is an episode entitled "Terror from the Phantom Zone" in which a comet's collision causes the Phantom Zone to release three Kryptonian villains Hul, Rom-Lok and Logar. The villains go on a crime spree and banish the Superfriends to the Phantom Zone but keep Superman on Earth...exposing him to red kryptonite which causes him to age quickly.  The villains get great enjoyment showing off "old Superman" to the world...Superman then manages to figure out with help from the Justice League computer that blue kryptonite may reverse the aging process because blue kryptonite is harmful to backwards Bizarro and therefore should be helpful to Superman.  Superman finds the blue kryptonite and is aged back to normal and then goes on his quest to rescue the other Super Friends from the Phantom Zone and ultimately send the three villains back into the Phantom Zone.  This episode can be found on the DVD collection "Super Friends: Volume Two", which features 16 Super Friends cartoons from 1978.

The Super Friends version of the Phantom Zone is described as, "Far beyond the boundaries of the Milky Way. In the uncharted void of deep space. An incredible 5th dimension of space and time, lies parallel to the universe that we know. This interesting interstellar warp which holds the most sinister and ruthless criminals in the galaxy is the infamous Phantom Zone." The molecular structure of any person exiled in the zone appears white and black. Batman's devices and the Wonder Twins' Exxor Powers are useless within the Phantom Zone.

Zy-Kree
A Phantom Zone villain named Zy-Kree, resembling the Superman II-version of General Zod, appears in the Super Friends episode, "The Evil From Krypton" in 1981.

Power Pirate
Anthro of the Traum, needing power for his planet, comes to Earth and masquerades as Sir Cedric Cedric of Scotland Yard to steal the power he needs. Appears in the Super Friends episode "The Power Pirate" (1973).

Professor Baffles
Mr. Mergen is a chemist that sought to destroy currency so mankind can begin anew with a clean slate. Appears in the Super Friends episode "The Baffles Puzzle" (1973).

Raven
A brilliant alien scientist that seeks revenge against Superman for imprisoning him. Appears in the Super Friends episode "The Menace Of The White Dwarf" (1973).

Sinbad
A human-looking space pirate who resembles a 16th-century pirate captain, not the Middle Eastern Sinbad of lore; comes to Earth with his crew to steal various treasures, including gold beneath the ruins of Stonehenge. The weapons at his disposal include flying pirate ships that can turn invisible and hypnotic cannons that fire mind-control beams. Appears in season 3, episode 4 "Sinbad and the Space Pirates".

Doctor Fright
A villain that uses a fear gas to paralyse his victims, turning them weak and frightened. Appears in season 2, episode 4 named "Doctor Fright", where Superman and Wonder Woman stopped his plans.

See also
 List of Justice League enemies

References

Lists of DC Comics animated television characters
Villains
 
Villains
Lists of DC Comics supervillains
Lists of characters in American television animation